Khorasan wheat or Oriental wheat (Triticum turgidum ssp. turanicum also called Triticum turanicum), commercially known as Kamut, is a tetraploid wheat species. The grain is twice the size of modern-day wheat, and has a rich, nutty flavor.

Taxonomy 
Original botanical identifications were uncertain. The variety is a form of Triticum turgidum subsp. turanicum (also known as Triticum turanicum), usually called Khorasan wheat. Identifications sometimes seen as T. polonicum are incorrect as the variety, although long-grained, lacks the long glumes of this species. Recent genetic evidence from DNA fingerprinting suggests that the variety is perhaps derived from a natural hybrid between T. durum and T. polonicum, which would explain past difficulties in arriving at a certain classification.

Life form 
As an annual, self-fertilized grass that is cultivated for its grains, Khorasan wheat looks very similar to common wheat. However, its grains are twice the size of modern wheat kernel, with a thousand-kernel weight of up to 60 grams (2.1 ounces). They contain more proteins, lipids, amino acids, vitamins and minerals than modern wheat. The grain has an amber colour and a high vitreousness.

Yield 
In drier years, Khorasan wheat can sometimes yield even more than durum wheat. However, in normal or wet years, it yields approximately 1/3 less than the durum wheat.

Distribution 
With only  cultivated worldwide, Khorasan wheat does not play an important role in the world food system. By capturing this niche market, Khorasan wheat counterbalances its weak agronomic traits.

Product use 
Khorasan wheat is used similarly as modern wheat. Its grains can be consumed whole, or milled into flour. It can be found in breads, bread mixes, breakfast cereals, cookies, waffles, pancakes, bulgur, baked goods, pastas, drinks, beer, and snacks.

Apart from its nutritional qualities, Khorasan wheat is recognized for its smooth texture and nutty, buttery flavor.

Nutrition and composition

Nutrients

In a  reference serving, Khorasan wheat provides  of food energy and is a rich source (more than 19% of the Daily Value, DV) of numerous essential nutrients, including protein (29% DV), dietary fiber (46% DV), several B vitamins and dietary minerals, especially manganese (136% DV) (table). Khorasan wheat is 11% water, 70% carbohydrates, 2% fat and 15% protein (table).

Composition 
Khorasan wheat has high protein content which improves its vitreousness which indicates a high milling yield.

Gluten

As khorasan wheat contains gluten, it is unsuitable for people with gluten-related disorders, such as celiac disease, non-celiac gluten sensitivity and wheat allergy sufferers, among others.

Requirements for climate and soil 
A temperate continental climate with cold nights in the early spring (see vernalisation), low to moderate precipitation rates (500–1,000 mm per year), and a sunny warm summer for optimal ripening are therefore the typical preferred climatic conditions of Khorasan wheat. These conditions are very similar to those of durum wheat, which originates in the same region. But, because breeding efforts for Khorasan wheat have been very sparse (see chapter below), the adaptation to other climatic conditions is still limited.

Khorasan wheat is especially known for its drought tolerance, which is even better than that of durum wheat. Too much precipitation, especially in the end of the season, usually leads to dramatic disease problems (see section below).

Soils typically used for Khorasan wheat are the same as for durum wheat: deep friable black clays with a certain water storing capacity, also known as vertisols.

Cultivation management, harvest and post-harvest treatment 
The cultivation practices are quite similar to other wheat species, especially durum. As most of the Khorasan wheat is organically produced, the nutrient supply (especially nitrogen) should be granted by using an appropriate crop rotation, such as previous pasture legumes. The nutritional content of Khorasan wheat is the most important characteristic of this crop and the reason why it is cultivated. Therefore, the nutrition supply is one of the critical aspects of this production.
Harvest in general follows the same procedure as in the other wheat species. As soon as the grains are mature, a combine harvester threshes the Khorasan wheat. But contrary to common wheat, the seeds of Khorasan wheat are very brittle and crack in half very easily, which leads to a necessarily more gentle harvest and post-harvest treatment.

Thinking of post-harvest treatments, the special physical properties of the Khorasan grain may cause difficulties (literature on that topic is still scarce). Storage may be more difficult because of a higher water capacity of the grains, the milling has to be adapted because of the big grains (should not be a problem in modern mills, in general) and the whole transportation machinery must deal with higher weight, because the Thousand Kernel Weight (TKW) is very high.

Growth, development, physiology 
Khorasan wheat is a tetraploid wheat subspecies, which means that the general biological properties resemble those of durum wheat.

Diseases 
The range of diseases in Khorasan wheat is more or less the same as in all other wheat species. Main diseases are typically caused by fungi, such as the Fusarium head blight or the "black tip". Khorasan wheat has been found very susceptible to Fusarium head blight.

Because of the high susceptibility to fungi, crop rotation is quite important, especially under organic production conditions. The rotation requirements resemble more or less those of durum wheat. Depending on the specific production setting, Khorasan production after maize or other cereals should be avoided. Typical robust rotations would contain some of the following crops: canola, sunflower, pulses, sorghum and pasture legumes.

Aspects of breeding 
The traditional aim of plant breeding is to improve the agronomic or nutritional qualities of a crop. Typical goals are improved yield, reduced susceptibility to diseases and pests, homogeneous maturation (to optimize harvest) and increased tolerance to environmental stresses, i.e., drought, acid soil, high or cold temperature, etc. Most of the known wheat species today are polyploid. Whereas common bread wheat is hexaploid, Khorasan wheat is tetraploid. To do further breeding with this tetraploid Khorasan wheat, the genetic pool to use is a little bit limited to the tetraploid subspecies of triticum turgidum such as durum (subsp. durum), Polish (subsp. polonicum), Persian (subsp. carthlicum), Emmer (subsp. dicoccum) and Poulard (subsp. turgidum) wheat. Especially to develop resistances against common fungi (e.g., Fusarium head blight), this genomic pool is interesting. Problematic in this case, is the economic unimportance of most of the tetraploid subspecies of wheat (except durum), which limits the investment to do intensive breeding, especially compared to the highly important common bread wheat.

Kamut 
KAMUT is a registered trademark owned by the US company Kamut, founded in Montana by organic farmer Bob Quinn.   The name designates the wheat cultivar of the subspecies Triticum turgidum ssp. turanicum from a commercial point of view.

The production and sale of this cultivar under the commercial name of Kamut is strictly regulated and must be certified and comply with a series of rules established by the US company.

The wheat produced from the cultivar was registered in 1990 with the United States Department of Agriculture (USDA) under the official name of QK-77 and was initially sold at agricultural fairs in Montana under the name of "King Tut wheat". The registration subsequently expired. The word Kamut derives from its hieroglyphic ideogram and means "wheat".

See also 
 Durum
 Emmer
 Spelt
 Einkorn

References

Further reading 
 
 
 

Wheat
Wheat cultivars